Olivier Mellano (born 21 July 1971) is a French  musician, composer, improvisator, writer and a guitarist who has played in more than fifty groups since the beginning of the nineties. He alternatively works on pop-rock projects and on compositions including symphonic orchestra,17 electric guitars, harpsichord, organ, voice or string quartet.

Life and career
Over the past twenty years composer, author and guitarist Olivier Mellano has collaborated with more than fifty pop, rap and rock groups including Psykick Lyrikah, Mobiil, Bed, Laetitia Shériff and Dominique A. His recent work has appeared in cinematic, theatrical, dance and literary contexts. In 2006 his landscape began to include new music and his recording "La Chair des Anges" was released on the Naive Classique label. He gives "cine-concerts" at venues around the world and acts as coordinator for collective project such as "L'Ile Electrique", "Superfolia Armaada", or "Ralbum". He also improvises as a soloist or in duets with Boris Charmatz, Robin Guthrie, Bertrand Chamayou, André Markowicz, Claro, François Jeanneau, John Greaves and many other artists.
In 2012, on commission from the Brittany Symphony Orchestra, he composed the triptych " How we tried a new combination of notes... " premiered at the Rennes opera with the Brittany Symphony, conducted by Jean-Michaël Lavoie, Valérie Gabail, soprano, the Pink Iced Club 12 electric guitars, MC Dälek, Simon Huw Jones, Black Sifichi...
He is currently working on his second book, has composed and performed music for the Handke/ Nordey play "Par les Villages" and is now back in the world of sonic rock with his solo album " MellaNoisEscape ".

Discography, musical creation and other appearances

Olivier Mellano discography  
 2018 MellaNoisEscape " Heartbeat of the Death "  (Olivier Mellano with Valentina Magaletti and Miët / Ulysse Maison d'Artistes - Sony Music France)
 2017 NO LAND (Olivier Mellano with Brendan Perry and Bagad Cesson / World Village [PIAS])
 2017 Miss Impossible (Plaza Mayor Music)
 2017 The Girl without Hands (Plaza Mayor Music)
 2016 TAN Dégât des eaux (Olivier Mellano - Richard Dumas / Les Editions de Juillet)
 2014 MellaNoisEscape (Olivier Mellano / Ulysse Productions)
 2014 Ekaterina Ivanovna – Pièces pour piano et ondes Martenot (Idwet/L'unijambiste)
 2012 How we tried a new combination of notes to show the invisible... (Naïve)
 2011 Herem – Ouvrage collectif avec A.Markowicz & D.Ramaën (Le dernier télégramme/L'unijambiste)
 2009 Ici Londres – Ouvrage collectif avec V.Cuvelier, A.Herbauts & A.Luneau (Editions du Rouergue)
 2008 Ralbum – Ouvrage collectif avec L.Limongi, E.Tugny...(Laureli/Léo Scheer)
 2006 La Chair des Anges (Naïve)
 2004 Pièces pour clavecin (La grange à disques)

Contributor to these records 

BAUM	
 2018 " Ici-Bas - Les Mélodies de Fauré  " (Sony Classical)

Régis Boulard	
 2016 " NO&RD  " (Bandcamp)
 2014 " Après tout " (Bandcamp)

John Greaves
 2015 " Verlaine Gisant  " (Signature/Radio France)
 2014 " Les airs  " (Signature/Radio France)

Psykick Lyrikah
 2013 " Jamais trop tard " (Yotanka) 
 2012 " Cahier d'un retour au pays natal /Aimé Césaire " (Bandcamp)  
 2010 " Acte 2 " (Bandcamp) 
 2008 " Vu d'ici " (Idwet) 
 2007 " Acte " (Idwet) 
 2004 " Des lumières sous la pluie " (Idwet)	

Jaromil
 2010 " Jetlag Memories " (Socadisc)

Robert Le Magnifique
 2009 " Knives in hems " (Idwet/L'unijambiste)
 2008 " Oh yeah baby " (Idwet)
 2003 " Hamlet II " (Idwet/L'unijambiste)

DPU
 2008 " Daniel Paboeuf Unity " (Il Monstro)	

XmasX
 2008 " XmasX " (range ta chambre)

Laetitia Sheriff
 2008 " Games over " (Fargo)					
 2004 " Codification " (Naïve)	
	
Dominique A
 2007 " Sur nos forces motrices – live " (Olympic Disk)
 2006 " L'horizon " (Olympic disk)	
 2002 " Le détour " (Virgin)	
 2001 " Auguri " (Virgin)

Betty Ford Clinic
 2007 " Conspiracies, Cover-Up & Crimes " (Beast Records)

Mobiil
 2007 " Fondre sur les hyènes " (Idwet)
 2005 " Contre le centre " (La grange à disques) 
 2001 " Prendre l'eau " (Secta records)

Nestor Is Bianca
 2006 " Out of the nest " (Montauk)
 2001 " Nestor is bianca " (La grange à disques)

Bed
 2005 " New Lines " (Ici d'ailleurs)	
 2003 " Spacebox " (Ici d'ailleurs)		
 2001 " The Newton Plum " (Ici d'ailleurs)	

Fred Vidalenc	
 2006 " Quelque chose dans l'ordre " (Wagram)
 2002 " La lattitude des chevaux " (Les Messieurs)

Compilation
 2005 " Bouchazoreille Slam Experience "	

Mudflow
 2004 " A life on standby " (No vice)	

Françoise Breut
 2000 " L'origine du monde " single (Labels)

Refree (Espagne)
 2003 " Nones " (Acuarela)

Miss Mary Mack
 2003 " 9 songs " (Modèle anatomique)

Polar
 1999 " Bi-Polar " ( Pias)

Lamour 
 1999 " Sanzao " (Bnc Production)

Sloy
 1998 " Electrelite " (Pias)

The Guilt
 1998 " Ad Solem »

Wasis Diop
 1999 " Toxu " (Mercury)

Yann Tiersen
 1999 " Tout est calme " (Ici d'ailleurs)

Miossec
 1998 " A Prendre " (Pias)
 1997 " Baiser " (Pias)

Santa Cruz
 2003 " Santa Cruz " (Hasta Luego Recordings)

Bruno Green
 2005 " Horse Mood " (La grange à disques)	
 1999 " A Tombeau Ouvert " (Silent records)
 1995 " Friday " (Ulm)				
 1993 " Digging for happiness " (Silent Records)

Vein
 1996 " Les années retournées " (Rrose Sélavy)

Complot Bronswick
 1995 " Complot " (Rrose Sélavy)

Rrose Selavy
 1998 Compilation 2 (Rrose Sélavy)
 1994 Compilation 1 (Rrose Sélavy)

Venus De Rides
 1991 " Vénus de rides " (Rrose Sélavy)

Other studio appearances 
Goldfrapp (GB) single Strict Machine remix Daniel Presley (unreleased), Les Marquises (remix), Moon Pilot, Loup Barrow, Martha Jane (Be), Dominic Sonic, Maujard, Little Rabbits (NYC project), Frandol (Roadrunners), Gallous, Core Dump, Betty Ford Clinic, Bikini Machine...

Film scores

Feature films
 The Girl Without Hands, Sébastien Laudenbach 
 Love Like Poison, Katell Quillévéré  
 Le fil d'Ariane, Marion Laine
 Halbschatten', Nicolas Wackerbach
 How we tried a new combination of light, Alantė Kavaitė (scénario O.Mellano/A. Kavaitė)

Short films
 " Vasco "  Sébastien Laudenbach Semaine de la critique Cannes 2010
 " Le jour de Gloire " Bruno Collet Prix pour la musique du Festival International de Soria 2008)
 " Méandres" / " Métamorphoses " medium-length film and 6 episodes F. Mihaille, E. Bouedec, M.Philippon
 " XI La force " Sébastien Laudenbach
 " Out " Marie Baptiste Roche
 " A sa trace "  Jean-Marie Vinclair
 " Des Ecchymoses " Car Lionnet
 " J'avais New-York dans ma poche intérieure " Florent Trochel

Documentaries
 " Odile Decq at work "  Martine Gonthier 
 " Comme une ligne rouge sur la mer " Chantal Gresset & Richard Volante

Musician in 
 " Dans les cordes " Magaly Richard Serrano
 " Où tu vas " Fred Gélard

Theatre compositions

 " Par les villages " Peter Handke by Stanislas Nordey (Création Festival d'Avignon 2013 Cour d'honneur) (O.Mellano interprète sur scène)
 " 9 petites filles " Sandrine Roche by Stanislas Nordey
 " Ekaterina Ivanovna " David Gauchard Cie L'Unijambiste
 " Richard 3 " David Gauchard Cie L'unijambiste (O. Mellano plays on the stage)
 " Démangeaisons de l'oracle " Florent Trochel
 " Montagne 42 " Florent Trochel
 " Trois bonheurs " Florent Trochel
 " Herem " Cie L'Unijambiste, A. Markowicz (O. Mellano plays on the stage)
 " Prends soin de l'ours " Théâtre de l'Arpenteur
 " Démiurges " Bob Théâtre 
 " Nosferatu "  Bob Théâtre. 
 " Gargantua " Cie Aïe Aïe Aïe
 " Blanche Neige " Nicolas Lieutard (Florent Trochel film)

Live performances with movies (ciné-concert)

 " Le Président " Dreyer (improvisation) Commissioned by the Festival Lumière Lyon (France) 2009
 " Images d'archives du pays de l'Ain " (improvisation) Commissioned by the city of Bourg en Bresse (France)
 " Pinocchio " de Comencini avec Massimo Dean et Vincent Guédon. Commissioned by the Travelling festival in Rennes (France) 2008
 " El Vampiro " Mendès with F.Ripoche, F.Pellegrini, J.Grubic in Tucson (Arizona) 2008
 " Buffet Froid " Bertrand Blier. Commissioned by the Travelling festival in Rennes (France) 2007.
 " Duel " Spielberg. Commissioned by the Rencontres du moyen métrage de Brive (France) 2006
 " L'Aurore " de F.W Murnau. Commissioned by the Fondation Cartier for Le Printemps de septembre in Toulouse (France) 2005

Music for choreographic works

 Improvised duet with Boris Charmatz Turin biennial Nov 2011
 " Fouille " by Franck Picard, Jean-Pierre company
 " Pour la Peau " Christine Le Berre company
 " Anticorps 7 " Christine Le Berre company
 " La Chair des Anges " Christine Le Berre company
 " L'Antre " Christine Le Berre company

Works

 " Gnat's drowning in the eye of Klaus Kinski " piece for 8 electric guitars
 " As the fire's tongues of earthly pleasure lick's the Holy's wings " piece for 8 electric guitars and 2 voices 
 " La chair des anges " piece for 2 harpsichords and organ
 " Eterre " piece for solo harpsichord
 " riVIEre " string quartet n°1
 " Chant d'électrons " electronic piece
 " Animarum perpetuus motus I "  piece for solo voice
 " Animarum perpetuus motus II " piece for 4 voices
 " Propter vos " piece for 3 voices, harpsichord, organ and cello 
 " The moving air " piece for organ (4 hands)
 " Somnia formidolorosa " piece for 8 electric guitars and 2 voices
 " Dead sparkling stars " piece for voice, electric guitares, harpsichords, string quartet and organ
 " How we tried a new combination of notes to show the invisible or even the embrace of the eternity " piece for symphonic orchestra and voice
 " How we tried a new combination of noise to show the invisible or even the embrace of the eternity " piece for 12 electric guitars, drum and voice
 " How we tried a new combination of one/0 to show the invisible or even the embrace of the eternity " piece for electronic and voices
 " Ekaterina Ivanovna'' " 13 pieces for piano and ondes Martenot

References

Decorations 
 knight of the order of Arts and Letters (2017)

External links

 
Olivier Mellano's Videos on Vimeo

1971 births
Living people
French guitarists
French male guitarists
Musicians from Paris
French film score composers
21st-century guitarists
French male film score composers
21st-century French male musicians